Shoshone-Episcopal Mission (also known as Shoshone-Episcopal Mission School for Shoshone Girls) is a historic mission and school in Fort Washakie, Wyoming. The school was built from 1889 to 1890 by Rev. John Roberts, the minister and teacher on the Wind River Indian Reservation. The school later became the headquarters of the entire Episcopal mission on the reservation.

The mission was added to the National Register of Historic Places on April 11, 1973.

On March 17, 2016, the building was destroyed by a fire.

References

External links
Shoshone Episcopal Mission at the Wyoming State Historic Preservation Office

Shoshone Episcopal Mission, Wind River Indian Reservation, Fort Washakie, Fremont, WY at the Historic American Buildings Survey (HABS), also ,  and 
Shoshone Episcopal Mission, Boarding School & Roberts Residence, Wind River Indian Reservation, Fort Washakie, Fremont, WY at HABS
Shoshone Episcopal Mission, Holy Saints John Chapel, Wind River Indian Reservation, Fort Washakie, Fremont, WY at HABS

Defunct schools in Wyoming
Properties of religious function on the National Register of Historic Places in Wyoming
Colonial Revival architecture in Wyoming
Churches completed in 1889
Buildings and structures in Fremont County, Wyoming
Historic American Buildings Survey in Wyoming
National Register of Historic Places in Fremont County, Wyoming
Episcopal churches in Wyoming
Wind River Indian Reservation
Demolished but still listed on the National Register of Historic Places